Surabhi Hande is an Indian actress who mainly works in Marathi industry. She is known for her performance in Jai Malhar. She made her debut in Marathi films with Kedar Shinde's Aga Bai Arechyaa 2.

Career
Surabhi kickstarted her career with the play Swami at a young age of 16. She worked with AIR for the ‘Sugam Sangit Karyakram’. She depicted a negative role in Star Pravah's TV show Ambat Goad. Her role of the fiery Mhalsa Devi in Zee Marathi serial Jai Malhar is her most memorable role. She also done an important role in the Marathi movie Aga Bai Arechyaa 2 in 2015.

Personal life
Surabhi is from Jalgaon. Her father, Sanjay Hande is a personality in the music field. Surabhi also keeps singing as a hobby. Her height is 5 feet 2 inches and has studied in Jalgaon, Maharashtra state. She got married with Durgesh Kulkarni in 2018.

Filmography

Television

Films

Music album

Plays
Swami

References

External links
 

Marathi actors
1989 births
Living people